Vocation is an unincorporated area in Monroe County, Alabama, United States.

History
A post office called Vocation was established in 1927, and remained in operation until 1932. The origin of the name "Vocation" is obscure.

References

Unincorporated communities in Monroe County, Alabama
Unincorporated communities in Alabama